Happy Ending is the second album by rock trio Dogstar.  It was recorded at Titan Recorders, Sherman Oaks, CA.

Track listing
 "Halo" - 2:53
 "Slipping Down" - 3:03
 "Enemies" - 3:11
 "Superstar" - 4:22 (Delaney & Bonnie)
 "Cornerstore" - 4:15
 "A Dreamtime" - 3:21
 "Stagger" - 3:48
 "Washington" - 4:11
 "Alarming" - 3:51
 "Swim" - 2:14
 "Blown Away" - 4:12

Personnel
Dogstar
Bret Domrose - lead vocals, guitar
Keanu Reeves - bass guitar, backing vocals
Robert Mailhouse - drums, percussion, backing vocals
with:
Richie Kotzen, Michael Nightingale - backing vocals
Technical
Richie Zito - producer on tracks 4, 5, 11, mixer on all tracks except 4 and 5
Michael Vail Blum - producer on all other tracks
Brian Reeves - mixer

References

2000 albums
Dogstar (band) albums
Albums produced by Richie Zito